This list includes Buddhist Kingdoms, Empires and Khanates in South Asia, South East Asia, East Asia, Central Asia, West Asia and Eastern Europe.

South Asia

Sri Lanka

India

Bangladesh 

 Pala Empire (750CE-1161CE)- Bangladesh,India,Pakistan

South East Asia

Myanmar

Thailand

Cambodia

Laos

East Asia

Mongolia

Korea

West Asia, East Europe

West Asia

 Ilkhanate (1256CE-1295CE)- ,,,,,,,,,,

East Europe

 Kalmyk Khanate (1630CE-1771CE)- ,

Central Asia

Kushan empire

See also

 History of Buddhism
 Buddhism

References

Buddhism by country Lists of dynasties